Babinda railway station is located on the North Coast line in Queensland, Australia. It serves the town of Babinda. The station has one platform.

Services
Babinda is served by Traveltrain's Spirit of Queensland service.

References

External links

North Queensland
Regional railway stations in Queensland
North Coast railway line, Queensland
Babinda